The inaugural first season of the Philippine mystery music game show I Can See Your Voice featured 123 regular episodes and 5 specials that premiered on ABS-CBN on September 16, 2017 and ended on January 6, 2019. This article is a list of episodes that the program had aired, as well as most details about each episode.

2017

Guest artists

SING-vestigators

2018 and 2019

Guest artists

SING-vestigators

Notes

References

I Can See Your Voice (Philippine game show)